Scotts' wrasse, Cirrhilabrus scottorum, is a species of wrasse native to the Pacific Ocean, where it occurs at depths of  on coral reefs from Australia's Great Barrier Reef to the Pitcairn Islands. It is found in the aquarium trade.

Named in honor of Sir Peter and Lady Philippa Scott, for their contribution to nature conservation. Both had a keen interest in marine life of tropic seas, particularly of fishes. They organized the dive cruise to the Coral Sea and accompanied the authors to Osprey Reef where they collected and photographed this fish.

References

External links
 

Scotts' wrasse
Taxa named by John Ernest Randall
Taxa named by Robert M. Pyle
Fish described in 1989